The International Convention on Standards of Training, Certification and Watchkeeping for Seafarers (STCW), requires that seafarers be provided with familiarization training and basic safety training which includes basic fire fighting, elementary first aid, personal survival techniques, and personal safety and social responsibility. This training is intended to ensure that seafarers are aware of the hazards of working on a vessel and can respond appropriately in an emergency.

According to STCW, The STCW 95 Code requires that you take this 5-day course of instruction. This course has to be renewed every 5 years, or under certain conditions, you have to show that you have at least 1 year of service on board vessels of 200 grt or more within the last 5 years. The components generally includes a Fire Prevention and Fire Fighting (Basic Fire fighting) course of  2 days, a Personal Survival Techniques (PST) course of 1.5 days, a Personal Safety and Social Responsibility (PSSR) course of  half a day, and, First Aid / CPR (Basic First Aid) course of  1 day.

Basic Offshore Safety Induction and Emergency Training or BOSIET is designed for marine personnel intending to work on an offshore installation in the UK maritime sector and forms part of a Common Offshore Safety Induction process.

References

International Maritime Organization
Law of the sea
Maritime education
Safety